Lichenothelia is a genus of fungi in the family Lichenotheliaceae.

Species
Lichenothelia antarctica 
Lichenothelia arida 
Lichenothelia convexa 
Lichenothelia ilamensis 
Lichenothelia iranica 
Lichenothelia muriformis 
Lichenothelia papilliformis 
Lichenothelia renobalesiana 
Lichenothelia rugosa 
Lichenothelia scopularia 
Lichenothelia spiratispora 
Lichenothelia umbrophila 
Lichenothelia uralensis

References

Dothideomycetes enigmatic taxa
Dothideomycetes genera
Taxa named by David Leslie Hawksworth
Taxa described in 1981